Drew Patrick Allar (born March 8, 2004) is an American football quarterback who currently plays for the Penn State Nittany Lions.

Early life and high school career
Allar grew up in Medina, Ohio and attended Medina High School. He became Medina's starting quarterback as a sophomore and passed for 1,802 yards and 23 touchdowns. Allar passed for 2,962 yards with 26 touchdowns during his junior season. As a senior, he completed 305 of 509 pass attempts (59.9%) for 4,444 yards and 48 touchdowns with seven interceptions and also rushed for 406 yards and nine touchdowns. Following the end of the season Allar was named Ohio Mr. Football. Over the course of his high school career Allar completed 630 of 1,149 pass attempts for 9,103 yards and 98 touchdowns with 20 interceptions.

Allar was initially rated a three-star recruit and committed to Penn State. After committing, he was later re-rated to a four-star recruit by most recruiting services and later as a five-star prospect by 247Sports.com.

College career
Allar joined the Penn State Nittany Lions as an early enrollee in January 2022. He was named the Nittany Lions' backup quarterback entering the 2022 season opener. Allar made his college debut in the season opener against Purdue, completing two passes on four attempts for 26 yards when starter Sean Clifford left the game due to an apparent knee injury. He played in nine games, all coming off of the bench, during his freshman season and completed 35 of 44 pass attempts for 344 yards and four touchdowns while also rushing for 52 yards and one touchdown.

References

External links
Penn State profile

Living people
Players of American football from Ohio
American football quarterbacks
Penn State Nittany Lions football players
People from Medina, Ohio
Sportspeople from Greater Cleveland
2004 births